The tiangou is a legendary creature from China. The tiangou resembles a black dog or meteor, which is thought to eat the sun or moon during an eclipse.

Tiangou eating the moon 
As a good spirit, it has the appearance of a white-headed fox, brings peace and tranquility, and gives protection from all sorts of troubles and robbers. It is also referred to by astrologers as a constellation guardian of welfare. This constellation consists of seven stars, and in ancient China it was called "Dog" (in the constellation Ship).

As a bad spirit, it is a black dog that eats the moon. According to the legends, as an interpretation of a lunar eclipse, after Houyi shot down the 9 suns in the sky, he was awarded with a pill that is said to make you immortal by Queen Mother of the west Wangmu Niang Niang. Before he could eat it, however, his wife, Chang Er ate it hoping that she could maintain her youth. Chang Er felt her body getting lighter and flew away. Seeing this, a black dog that Hou Yi was rearing went inside her room and licked the remains of the pill. He then chased after Chang Er, getting bigger and bigger. Chang Er, terrified, hid on the moon. The black dog ate the moon, along with Chang Er.

After knowing this, Wangmu Niang Niang captured the dog. She was surprised to see that the dog was actually Hou Yi's and assigned him to guard the gates of heavens, henceforth becoming Tiangou. The moon and Chang Er was spit back out, and Chang Er continued living on the moon.

Battle with Zhang Xian

Zhang Xian is the enemy of the tiangou. It is said that he protects his children from the dog god with his bow and arrows. He is often depicted aiming at the sky, waiting for the beast to appear.

He is the god of birth and the protector of male children. Many sought for him to give them male offspring and to protect their living sons.

Meaning in Japan

The term tengu and the characters used to write it are borrowed from the name of tiangou  though this still has to be confirmed. Despite the characters, both creatures are independent mythological creatures  with no common ancestor or origin, tengu is usually depicted as a bird or man with a long nose and other bird-like characteristics while the tiangou is a dog.

See also

Dog (Chinese mythology)
Fenrir, the wolf of Norse mythology whose sons Sköll and Hati Hróðvitnisson swallow the sun and moon during Ragnarök
Tengu (Japan)

References

de Visser, M. W. (1908). "The Tengu". Transactions of the Asiatic Society of Japan 34 (2): pp. 25–99. Z. P. Maruya & Co.

Yaoguai
Mythological dogs
Eclipses